This is a list of all of RC Strasbourg Alsace matches in UEFA competitions.

Overall record
Accurate as of March 31, 2019

Legend: GF = Goals For. GA = Goals Against. GD = Goal Difference.

Results

References

RC Strasbourg Alsace
French football clubs in international competitions